Two Weddings and a Funeral is a 2012 South Korean gay romantic comedy film that explores the taboos and intolerance in Korean society in the story of a gay man and lesbian who enter into a sham marriage. It is the feature film debut of out filmmaker Kim Jho Kwang-soo, and his fourth LGBT-themed film.

Although the film didn't emerge as a mainstream hit, its 10-day total of 32,000 admissions was impressive for a specialty release, making it the most commercially successful queer Korean film yet.

Plot
A gay man, Min-soo (Kim Dong-yoon) and a lesbian woman, Hyo-jin (Ryu Hyun-kyung) are both promising doctors at a general hospital. The colleagues agree to marry so Hyo-jin can legally adopt a child with her lover of ten years Seo-young (Jung Ae-yeon), and Min-soo can please his parents while maintaining his closeted lifestyle. While secretly living with their respective partners, who move in next door, Min-soo and Hyo-jin appear to be a happy, "normal" couple. They enjoy all the benefits afforded to heterosexual couples and are also able to ward off public scrutiny and parental disapproval. However, Min-soo's intrusive parents begin to get a bit too involved with the couple's life, threatening their scheme.

Cast
Kim Dong-yoon - Min-soo
Ryu Hyun-kyung - Hyo-jin
Song Yong-jin - Seok
Jung Ae-yeon - Seo-young
Park Jung-pyo - Tina
Park Soo-young - Big sister
Lee Seung-joon - Kyeong-nam
Kim Joon-beom - Joo-noh
Han Seung-do - Young-gil
Jang Se-hyun - Ik-hoon
Jung In-young - Nurse Na
Choi Il-hwa - Min-soo's father
Shin Hye-jung - Min-soo's mother
Kim Hyuk - Seok's ex-boyfriend
Yoo Yeon-seok - Joon, Seok's younger brother
Kwon Hae-hyo - senior colleague doctor (cameo)
Lee Moon-sik - priest (cameo)
Jung In-gi - taxi driver (cameo)

References

External links
  
 
 
 

2012 films
South Korean romantic comedy films
South Korean LGBT-related films
Films directed by Kim-Jho Gwangsoo
2010s South Korean films